William U. Saunders represented Gadsden County, Florida, in the Florida Legislature during the Reconstruction era.

He was a delegate from Gadsden County to the 1868 Constitutional Convention of Florida despite having been in the county only a few days in his life, according to one account. He had been a barber in Illinois or Maryland. He was described as an eloquent speaker. In 1948 he was described as a Northern Radical Republican.

He traveled the state rallying Black voters.

Historian T. D. Allman wrote that racist revisionists tried to recast him as mulatto to deny his being a black man.

References

 
Date of birth missing
Date of death missing
African-American state legislators in Florida
Florida Republicans
Radical Republicans
African-American politicians during the Reconstruction Era